Thylacodes riisei is a species of sea snail, a marine gastropod mollusk in the family Vermetidae, the worm snails or worm shells. This species was previously known as Serpulorbis riisei.

Distribution

Description
The maximum recorded shell length is 37 mm.

Habitat
The minimum recorded depth for this species is 0 m; maximum recorded depth is 2 m.

References

External links

Vermetidae
Gastropods described in 1862